Julia Borisovna Novikova (born 5 October 1983) is a Russian coloratura soprano.

She was born in Leningrad. As a child her parents took her to see performances at the Mariinsky Theatre. In 2006 she graduated from Saint Petersburg Conservatory after studying opera singing under Professor Olga Kondina.

In her professional debut she appeared in 2006 as Flora in Britten's The Turn of the Screw conducted by Valery Gergiev at Mariinsky Theatre. In 2009 at 25 years of age she won best female voice and audience favorite at Operalia in Budapest, following in the footsteps of the first Russian winner Yelena Manistina in 2002.

She garnered international attention after performing in the 2010 RADA Film Production of Verdi's Rigoletto a Mantova opposite Plácido Domingo. The production was conducted by Zubin Mehta and televised live in 148 countries.

Awards
Wilhelm Stenhammar International Music Competition, Sweden (2006)
Concours de Geneve, Switzerland and Neue Stimmen, Germany (2007)
Emmerich Smola Förderpreis – in the context of Musikdebüt project of SWR Television (2008)
Operalia – First Prize for best female voice, Audience Prize winner, Budapest (2009)

References

External links

1983 births
Living people
Singers from Saint Petersburg
Russian operatic sopranos
Saint Petersburg Conservatory alumni
Operalia, The World Opera Competition prize-winners
21st-century Russian women  opera singers